Peter King is a judge and former Unionist politician in Northern Ireland.

King is a member of the Bar of England and Wales (Gray's Inn 1993), the Bar of Northern Ireland (1994) and the Bar of Ireland (2009), and was an active member of the Ulster Unionist Party (UUP).  He headed the party list in South Antrim for the 1996 Northern Ireland Forum election, and was easily elected.  He worked with David Brewster and Dean Godson on the UUP's "Strand I" team at the talks which led to the Good Friday Agreement.

King did not stand in the 1998 Northern Ireland Assembly election, and became known as an opponent of the Good Friday Agreement, acting as a spokesman for the anti-agreement Union First group.  He also became chairman of the Young Unionists.

King was suggested as a possible UUP candidate in the 2000 South Antrim by-election, but the party instead stood David Burnside.  In 2001, he was part of a group of anti-agreement UUP members who met with John de Chastelain of the Independent International Commission on Decommissioning.

During the previous mandate of the Northern Ireland Assembly, King was a Special Advisor to the First Minister of Northern Ireland.

King returned to full-time practice as a criminal defence barrister in May 2011.  He was appointed a District Judge in November 2013.  In 2014 he found that the evidence against three people was insufficient for them to be sent for trial by jury in relation to the Death of Robert Hamill

References

Year of birth missing (living people)
Living people
Judges in Northern Ireland
Members of the Northern Ireland Forum
Ulster Unionist Party politicians